Nancy Price, CBE (3 February 1880 – 31 March 1970), was an English actress on stage and screen, author and theatre director. Her acting career began in a repertory theatre company before progressing to the London stage, silent films, talkies and finally television. In addition to appearing on stage she became involved in theatre production and was a founder of the People's National Theatre.

Personal life 
Christened Lilian Nancy Bache Price in Kinver, Staffordshire, England, in 1880, Nancy was the daughter of William Henry Price (a retired farmer) and Sarah Mannix. Her mother was the granddaughter of Sir Henry Mannix. After schooling in her home village and then in nearby Malvern Wells she decided at an early age to become an actress. She married the actor Charles Maude on 17 May 1907, and they were together until his death in 1943. They had two daughters Joan Maude and Elizabeth Maude. Joan, Elizabeth, and Elizabeth's daughter Jennifer Phipps all went on to become actresses. Soon after Charles and Nancy's daughters were born, they made the village of Findon in Sussex her home, living in a cottage called 'Arcana' in Heather Lane on the Downs.

She also wrote many books, including her autobiography, 'The Gull's Way'.
At one time she managed the 'Little Theatre' in the Adelphi, off the Strand.

Findon remained her home until her death in 1970.

Theatre career 
Nancy joined F.R. Benson's theatre company whilst still at school. The company specialised in Shakespeare's plays and toured extensively in the provinces. Her first big break came when she caught the attention of Sir Herbert Beerbohm Tree, who cast her as Calypso in Stephen Phillips's production of Ulysses at Her Majesty's Theatre, London in 1902, a role in which she enjoyed great success. The part of Hilda Gunning was written for her by Arthur Wing Pinero in Letty (1904), a role in which the theatre critic J. T. Grein said: "In Letty, while others enhanced their fame, Miss Nancy Price, in the part of Hilda, the shop-girl, made her name. If we read the character aright, Miss Price realised it well-nigh to perfection". In 1909 she appeared as Mrs. D'Aquila in George Dance's production of The Whip at the Theatre Royal, Drury Lane. She joined Edith Craig's Pioneer Players at the Kingsway Theatre in 1911 for a performance of Christopher St. John's The First Actress. In March 1912, she appeared as India in Sir Edward Elgar's Imperial Masque The Crown of India at the London Coliseum.

Together with the Dutch-born theatre impresario J.T. Grein, Nancy Price founded the People's National Theatre in 1930. Their first production was The Man from Blankleys by F. Anstey at the Fortune Theatre. When Grein left the company Nancy became its honorary director, and in 1932 a permanent home was found at the Little Theatre in the Adelphi with Nancy as manager. The enterprise came to an end with the destruction of the theatre in 1941. During this period, Nancy established the English School Theatre Movement, which toured productions of Shakespeare plays to working class children.

In the 1950 King's Birthday Honours, Nancy was awarded a CBE for services to the stage. In the same year, she gave her final stage performance as Martha Blanchard in Eden Phillpotts' The Orange Orchard at the New Lindsey Theatre.

Theatre performances

Film career 
Having established herself as a stage actress in London's West End, Nancy's first film role was in the black and white, silent film The Lyons Mail. In the next decade she appeared in a further eight silent films before her first 'talkie', The American Prisoner, which was recorded in mono sound in 1929. The last silent film in which she appeared The Price of Divorce was adapted by producer Oswald Mitchell to incorporate sound and released under the name Such is the Law.

Filmography

Television filmography

Radio Broadcasting

Bibliography

Plays
 Whiteoaks: A Play (With Mazo de la Roche, Macmillan, 1936)
 The Orange Orchard (With Eden Phillpotts, London: Samuel French, 1951)

Poetry
 Hurdy-Gurdy (London : Frederick Muller, 1944)

Novels
 Ta-mera (London : Hutchinson & Co., 1950)

Essays, memoires and diaries

 Behind the Night-Light: the by-world of a child of three. Described by Joan Maude and faithfully recorded by Nancy Price (London : John Murray, 1912)
 Vagabond’s Way. Haphazard wanderings on the fells ... With illustrations by A.S. Hartrick (London : John Murray, 1914)
 Shadows on the Hills, etc. On the English Lake District. With plates (London : Victor Gollancz, 1935)
 The Gull’s Way. An account of a cruise along the East Coast of England (London : Victor Gollancz, 1937)
 Nettles and Docks, etc. Essays (London : G. Allen & Unwin, 1940)
 Jack by the Hedge, etc. Sketches of country life (London : Frederick Muller, 1942)
 I had a Comrade “Buddy” On the author’s dog (London : G. Allen & Unwin, 1944)
 Tails and Tales. On dogs (London : Victor Gollancz, 1945)
 Where the Skies Unfold, etc. Essays (Birmingham : George Ronald, 1947)
 Wonder of Wings. A book about birds (London : Victor Gollancz, 1947)
 Acquainted with the Night. A book of dreams (Illustrated by Michael Rothenstein, Oxford : George Ronald, 1949)
 Bright Pinions. On parrots (Oxford : George Ronald, 1952)
 Feathered Outlaws (London & Worthing : Henry E. Walter, 1953)
 In Praise of Trees. An anthology for friends (London : Frederick Muller, 1953)
 Into an Hour-Glass. An autobiography (London : Museum Press, 1953)
 Pagan’s Progress. High days and holy days (London : Museum Press, 1954)
 The Heart of a Vagabond. On country life in Sussex (London : Museum Press, 1955)
 I watch and listen. A book mainly concerned with the courtship and song of birds (London : Bodley Head, 1957)
 Winged Builders. A book of bird lore, chiefly concerned with the nesting, building and family habits of British birds (London : George Ronald, 1959)
 Each in his own way! Personalities I have valued, selected from my album of memories ... Woodcuts by William Wood (London : Frederick Muller, 1960)

References

External links
 Photos of Nancy Price
 Little Theatre in the Adelphi
 Nancy playing banjo
 Tribute to Warrior birds commissioned by Nancy Price
 British Pathe newsreel film featuring Nancy Price
 Photograph of Nancy Price as Mrs. D'Acquilar in The Whip

1880 births
1970 deaths
20th-century English actresses
English film actresses
English silent film actresses
English stage actresses
English television actresses
English memoirists
English women novelists
English diarists
English women poets
Commanders of the Order of the British Empire
People from Kinver
English theatre directors
British women memoirists
Women diarists
20th-century English poets
20th-century English novelists
20th-century English writers
English women non-fiction writers
People from Findon, West Sussex